Otto Jungtow (29 December 1892 – 19 August 1959) was a German international footballer.

References

1892 births
1959 deaths
Association football midfielders
German footballers
Germany international footballers
Hertha BSC players